Three ships of the United States Navy have been named USS Corpus Christi for the city of Corpus Christi, Texas or related areas.

 , was a  patrol frigate that served in World War II.
 , is a 
 , formerly , was a helicopter repair ship, from 1965 until 1974.

United States Navy ship names